The Tsibritsa (also transliterated as Cibrica, Tzibritza) is a river in the western Danubian Plain of northern Bulgaria and a right tributary of the Danube. The river originates in the Shiroka Planina ("Wide Mountain") area of the Fore-Balkan Mountains near the Serbian border and flows in a northeast direction diagonally through Montana Province. East of the village of Dolni Tsibar in Valchedram municipality, it flows into the Danube.

The Tsibritsa has a length of 91.2 kilometres and a drainage basin of 922 square kilometres. At Ignatovo near the Tsibritsa's mouth its average discharge is 2 cubic metres per second. The river's waters are used for irrigation. The low plateau between the Tsibritsa to the west and the Ogosta to the east is known as Zlatiya and is a fertile agricultural region.

In Ancient Roman times, the river was known as the Ciabrus and the region was inhabited by the Thracian tribe of the Triballi.

References

 

Rivers of Bulgaria
Landforms of Montana Province